Christian Louis I, Duke of Mecklenburg-Schwerin (1 December 1623 in Schwerin – 21 June 1692 in The Hague) was a reigning Duke of Mecklenburg-Schwerin.

Life 
Christian Louis I was born as Christian I, the son of the Duke Adolf Frederick I and his wife, Anna Maria (1601–1634), the daughter of Count Enno III of East Frisia.

On 26 August 1625, when he was only one year old, his father proposed that he be the next administrator of the Bishopric of Schwerin.  However, he was never appointed, because when Administrator Ulrik III died on 12 August 1633, the Bishopric fell to Wallenstein as a completed fief.  He inherited Mecklenburg-Schwerin when his father died on 27 February 1658.  In 1660, he built a Lustschloss near the Ratzeburg Minster.  He travelled to Paris in 1662, to the court of Louis XIV.  On 29 September 1663, he converted to the Catholic faith.  The next day, his godfather Louis XIV gave him the second name Louis.  Later, however, he often signed only with Christian.

His body was transported by ship to Dömitz. It was then transported to Schwerin and finally arrived on 24 August 1692 in Doberan, where he was buried in the Doberan Minster.

Marriages 
He married twice. His first wife was Christine Margarethe of Mecklenburg-Güstrow (31 March 1615 – 16 August 1666), the second daughter of Duke John Albert II. Francis Albert had died on 10 June 1642 from wounds he had received in the battle of Świdnica. She married Christian on 6 July 1650 in Hamburg. However, on 16 October 1660, a divorce was pronounced by an ecclesiastical court composed specifically for this case by Christian. She never recognized the divorce. It was, however, declared valid by a committee of ten professors of canon law of the University of Paris the Sorbonne. The divorce was confirmed by the Pope on 3 October 1663.

His second wife was Elisabeth Angelique de Montmorency, Duchesse de Coligny, (b. 1626). She was the widow Gaspard IV de Coligny, the son of Gaspard III de Coligny. Her first husband had died at Charenton-le-Pont on 9 February 1649 during the Fronde. The exact date of Elisabeth Angelique's wedding to Christian Louis is not known with certainty, but it was probably on 3 March 1664.

Both marriages were childless.  When Christian Louis I died, he was succeeded by his nephew Frederick William, the eldest son of Duke Frederick of Mecklenburg-Grabow.

Ancestry

References 
 
 Richard Wagner: Herzog Christian (Louis) I., 1658-1692 = Mecklenburgische Geschichte in Einzeldarstellungen, issue 9, Süsserott, Berlin, 1906,

External links 
 
 Christian Louis I. at www.emecklenburg.de
 Genealogy of the House of Mecklenburg

Dukes of Mecklenburg-Schwerin
1623 births
1692 deaths
House of Mecklenburg